The 2004 Tennessee Democratic presidential primary was held on February 10 in the U.S. state of Tennessee as one of the Democratic Party's statewide nomination contests ahead of the 2004 presidential election.

Results

References 

Tennessee
Democratic primary
2004